The NASA Distinguished Service Medal is the highest award that can be bestowed by the National Aeronautics and Space Administration of the United States. The medal may be presented to any member of the federal government, including both military astronauts and civilian employees.

The NASA Distinguished Service Medal is awarded to those who display distinguished service, ability, or courage, and have personally made a contribution representing substantial progress to the NASA mission.  The contribution must be so extraordinary that other forms of recognition would be inadequate.

Typical presentations of the NASA Distinguished Service Medal included awards to senior NASA administrators, mission control leaders, and astronauts who have completed several successful space flights.  Due to the prestige of the award, the decoration is authorized for wear on active uniforms of the United States military.  Another such authorized decoration is the NASA Space Flight Medal.

Upon the recommendation of NASA, the president may award an even higher honor to astronauts, the Congressional Space Medal of Honor.

The medal was original awarded by the National Advisory Committee for Aeronautics and was inherited by NASA. The first NASA version (type I), featuring the NASA seal, was issued from 1959 until 1964, when it was replaced by the current type II medal (shown).

Recipients

1959
 John W. Crowley, Jr., NASA Director of Aeronautical and Space Research

1961
 Alan Shepard (May 8) 
 Virgil I. Grissom (July 22)

1962
 John Glenn
 Robert Gilruth
 Scott Carpenter
 Wally Schirra (October 15)
 Forrest S. Petersen, X-15 pilot
 Robert White, X-15 pilot
 Joseph A. Walker, X-15 pilot
 Walter C. Williams

1963
 Gordon Cooper

1965
 Wally Schirra (December 30) (second award)

1968
 James Webb
 Alexander Flax

1969

1970 

 Edwin E. Aldrin
 Neil A. Armstrong
 Alan L. Bean
 Michael Collins
 Charles Conrad
 Richard F. Gordon
 Fred W. Haise
 James A. Lovell (second award)
 Thomas O. Paine
 John L. Swigert

1971

 Charles J. Donlan
 James B. Irwin
 Vincent L. Johnson
 Walter J. Kapryan
 Eugene F. Kranz
 Bruce T. Lundin
 Glynn S. Lunney
 James A. McDivitt
 Edgar D. Mitchell
 Bernard Moritz
 Dale D. Myers
 Oran W. Nicks
 Stuart A. Roosa
 David R. Scott (second award)
 Alan B. Shepard (second award)
 Sigurd A. Sjoberg
 John W. Townsend
 Alfred M. Worden

1972

 Charles M. Duke
 Paul Werner Gast
 William R. Lucas
 Hans M. Mark
 Thomas K. Mattingly
 Richard C. McCurdy
 William T. Pecora
 Dan Schneiderman
 John W. Young (second award)

1973

1974

1975

1976

1977

1978

1980
 William H. Bayley

1981
Robert L. Crippen
Paul C. Donnelly
James B. Odom
Andrew J. Stofan
John F. Yardley
Walter C. Williams (second award)

1984
 Robert O. Aller

1988
Willis H. Shapley  (second award)

1991

 John R. Casani

1992
 Berrien Moore III
 Mark Albrecht
 Story Musgrave

1994
 Joseph H Rothenberg

1995
 Dr. Charles J. Pellerin
 Bill G. Aldridge

1996
 Gerald M. Smith

2000
 Joseph H Rothenberg

2001
 Jack Brooks
 Claude Nicollier
 Courtney Stadd
 James S. Voss
 Joseph Philip Loftus

2002
 Scott E. Parazynski

2004
Kalpana Chawla
William McCool
Axel Roth
 Brock "Randy" Stone
 Lott W. Brantley Jr.
 G. Scott Hubbard
 Edward T. Lu

2005
Firouz Naderi

2006

 Eileen M. Collins

2007
 Douglas Hendriksen

2008
 Walter Cunningham
 Donn Eisele
 Fuk Li
 Walter Schirra (Third Award)
 E. Myles Standish
 Richard Sunseri

2009
Christopher Scolese
 Stephanie D. Wilson

2010

2011

2012

2015

2016

2017

2018

2019

See also 
List of NASA awards

References

External links

 NASA awards
 National Aeronautics and Space Administration Honor Awards (1969–1978)
 List of NASA medal recipients

Awards and decorations of NASA
Awards established in 1959